The Great Falls Voyagers are an independent baseball team of the Pioneer League, which is not affiliated with Major League Baseball (MLB) but is an MLB Partner League. They are located in Great Falls, Montana, and play their home games at Centene Stadium. 

The team has played continuously in the Pioneer League since 1969, and previously played in the league from 1948 to 1963. In conjunction with a contraction of Minor League Baseball in 2021, the Pioneer League was converted from an MLB-affiliated Rookie Advanced league to an independent baseball league and granted status as an MLB Partner League, with Great Falls continuing as members. Prior to this, the Voyagers had been affiliated with the Brooklyn/Los Angeles Dodgers (1952–1963), San Francisco Giants (1969–1983), Los Angeles Dodgers (1984–2002), and Chicago White Sox (2003–2020). The team was not affiliated with any MLB team from 1964 to 1968.

Voyagers
The Voyagers name refers to the Mariana UFO incident in August 1950 when Nicholas "Nick" Mariana, the general manager of the Great Falls Selectrics, saw two spinning objects approaching at a seemingly high speed. Mariana recorded 16 seconds of footage of the unidentified flying objects at Legion Park.

Playoffs
2018: Defeated Billings 2-0 in semifinals; defeated Grand Junction 2-0 to win league championship.
2017: Defeated Missoula 2-0 in semifinals; lost to Ogden 2-1 in league championship.
2016: Lost to Billings 2-0 in semifinals.
2014: Lost to Billings 2-0 in semifinals.
2013: Lost to Helena 2-0 in semifinals.
2012: Lost to Missoula 2-1 in semifinals.
2011: Defeated Missoula 2-1 in semifinals; defeated Ogden 2-1 to win league championship.
2010: Lost to Helena 2-1 in semifinals.
2009: Lost to Missoula 2-1 in semifinals.
2008: Defeated Orem 2-1 to win league championship.
2007: Lost to Orem 2-0 in finals.
2002: Defeated Provo 2-1 to win league championship.
2000: Lost to Idaho Falls 2-0 in finals.
1997: Lost to Billings 2-0 in finals.

Pete Rose Jr.
On December 18, 2012, Pete Rose Jr., the son of major league career hits leader Pete Rose, was named the Voyagers' manager. He replaced Ryan Newman. Under Rose Jr. the Voyagers held a 48-28 record and made it to the Pioneer League playoffs where they were eliminated by the Helena Brewers. On January 20, 2014, it was announced that then hitting coach Charlie Poe would manage the Voyagers for the 2014 season, ending Rose Jr.'s tenure as manager.

Great Falls players with MLB experience

Hall of Fame Members
Bobby Cox 1963
Pedro Martinez 1990

1948 Jim Hughes, Bill White
1951 Bennie Daniels Jr, Dick Barone
1953 John Roseboro
1954 Larry Sherry
1955 Donald LeJohn
1956 Dick Scott
1957 Ed Palmquist, Jack Smith, Doug Camilli
1958 Larry Burright, Jim Duckworth
1959 Dick Smith, Bill Kunkel
1960 Nate Oliver, Rod Miller
1961 Gene Brabender
1962 Bob Griffith, Clarence Jones
1963 Bobby Cox, Angel Alcaraz
1969 Gary Thomasson, Elías Sosa, Ed Goodson, Horace Speed, Skip Pitlock, Steve Ontiveros, Mike Phillips
1970 Butch Metzger, Doug Capilla, John D'Acquisto
1971 Frank Riccelli, Willie Prall, Steven Stroughter, Gregg Thayer
1972 Ed Halicki, Bob Knepper, Gary Alexander, Rob Dressler, Reggie Walton, Fred Kuhaulua, Terry Cornutt
1973 Tommy Toms, Johnnie LeMaster, Jack Clark, Pete Falcone, Jeff Little, Ed Plank
1974 John Henry Johnson, Guy Sularz
1975 Alan Wirth, Jeff Yurak, Mike Rowland, Jose Barrios, Rick Murray
1976 Joe Strain Jr, Bob Brenly, Casey Parsons
1977 Phil Huffman, DeWayne Buice, Bob Kearney, Tom Runnells, Jeff Stember, Bob Tufts
1978 John Rabb, Rob Deer
1979 Scott Garrelts, Tom O'Malley, Frank Williams, Chris Brown, Randy Kutcher
1980 Alan Fowlkes, Randy Gomez, Jessie Reid, Mark Dempsey
1981 Matt Nokes, Mark Grant, Phil Ouellette
1982 Randy Bockus, Pat Larkin
1983 Eric King, Mike Aldrete, Charlie Hayes, John Burkett, Alonzo Powell, Ángel Escobar
1984 Darren Holmes, Tim Scott, Wayne Kirby, Luis Lopez, Jeff Nelson
1985 Mike Devereaux, Jack Savage, Mike Huff, John Wetteland
1986 Kevin Campbell, Dave Hansen, Mike Munoz
1987 Rafael Bournigal, Dennis Springer, Tony Barron, Zak Shinall
1988 Eric Karros, José Offerman, Mike James, Jeff Hartsock, Jerry Brooks, Eddie Pye
1989 Jamie McAndrew, Matt Howard, Tom Goodwin 
1990 Pedro Martínez, Raúl Mondesí, Mike Mimbs, Garey Ingram
1991 Henry Blanco, Roberto Mejía, Juan Castro, José Parra, Rick Gorecki, Todd Williams, Ken Huckaby, Willis Otáñez
1992 Roger Cedeño, Félix Rodríguez, Chad Zerbe, Chris Latham
1993 Wilton Guerrero
1994 Dennys Reyes, Adam Riggs, Nate Bland, Ricky Stone
1995 Pedro Feliciano, Luke Prokopec, Ángel Peña
1996 Brad Thomas
1997 Víctor Álvarez, Luke Allen
1998 Jorge Piedra
1999 Shane Victorino, Jason Repko
2000 Ricardo Rodríguez, Willy Aybar, Reggie Abercrombie, Joel Hanrahan, Agustín Montero
2002 Jonathan Broxton, James Loney, Joel Guzmán, Eric Stults, Delwyn Young, Eric Hull, Arturo López
2003 Brandon McCarthy, Brian Anderson, Boone Logan, Sean Tracey, Chris Young, Ryan Sweeney, Fernando Hernández, Tom Jacquez
2004 Donny Lucy, Adam Russell, Jack Egbert, Jay Marshall
2005 Brandon Allen, Chris Getz, Clayton Richard, Carlos Torres
2006 Chris Carter
2007 John Ely, Aaron Poreda
2008 Eduardo Escobar, Daniel Hudson, Brent Morel
2009 Trayce Thompson
2010 David Holmberg, Addison Reed, Taylor Thompson, Andy Wilkins
2011 Chris Devenski, Erik Johnson, Kevan Smith, Scott Snodgress
2012 Chris Beck, Micah Johnson, Mike Marjama
2013 Adam Engel, Brad Goldberg, Jacob May
2014 Brandon Brennan, Aaron Bummer, Jace Fry, Zach Thompson
2016 Bernardo Flores Jr, Matt Foster
2017 Luis Gonzalez
2018 Romy Gonzalez, Codi Heuer, Davis Martin, Konnor Pilkington, Lenyn Sosa, Bennett Sousa, Jonathan Stiever, Steele Walker

Roster

References

External links
 Great Falls Voyagers

Baseball teams established in 1969
Pioneer League (baseball) teams
Sports in Great Falls, Montana
Professional baseball teams in Montana
Chicago White Sox minor league affiliates
San Francisco Giants minor league affiliates
Los Angeles Dodgers minor league affiliates
1969 establishments in Montana